Gary "Gaz" Alazraki is the director of Father of the Bride (2022); writer and director of Mexico's record breaking comedy Nosotros los Nobles (2013); and the co-creator, executive producer and director of Club de Cuervos (2015), Netflix's first original series in Spanish. He heads Alazraki Entertainment and is a Board Member of Oceana.

Background and Education
Gaz was born in Mexico City. He is the son of Carlos Alazraki and Cynthia Alazraki. He studied at the American School Foundation in Mexico City and graduated in 2001 with a Bachelor in Arts in Cinema and Media Studies from the University of Southern California.

Early career
Gaz acquired on-set experience at the beginning of his career by directing commercials, and the short films: Volver, volver (2005) starring Jaime Camil, Martha Higareda, Tony Dalton and La Hora Cero (2008) produced by Guillermo Arriaga.

Nosotros los Nobles

In 2011 Gaz began production for Nosotros los Nobles starring Gonzalo Vega, Luis Gerardo Méndez, Karla Souza, and Juan Pablo Gil. The film was released by Warner Bros. in 2013 and it became the highest grossing Mexican Movie of all time. Rotten Tomatoes gave it a 100% rating and the film stayed in the Box-Office-Top-10 for 17 weeks -second place to Titanic (20 weeks). With 7.2 million viewers and $340 million pesos in box office sales, it doubled the record from the previous Highest Grossing Mexican Film in History.

The film’s satirical take on the 1% was profiled by The New York Times, The Wall Street Journal, and the LA Times, while the Box Office performance was headlined in Forbes, Variety and The Hollywood Reporter.

It won Best Movie at the CANACINE Awards, and garnered Luis Gerardo Méndez the nomination for Best Actor at The Mexican Academy Awards as well as a nomination for Best Screenplay.

Expansion Magazine awarded the Alazraki Brothers the "Marketers of the Year" award, while Quien Magazine placed Alazraki in the list of the "50 Most Influential Mexicans of the Year," and Forbes called him one of the "30 Most Creative Mexicans in the World."

Club de Cuervos

In 2014 Gaz teamed up with Luis Gerardo Méndez again for what would become Netflix’s first International Original series.

The show based on a fictional Soccer Team called Los Cuervos de Nuevo Toledo, got an 80% score on Rotten Tomatoes. It ran for 4 seasons, and gave way to Netflix’s first spin off: The Ballad of Hugo Sánchez -Directed and Executive Produced by his brother and partner Mark Alazraki.

In 2017, Netflix touted Club de Cuervos as its most binge-raced show in Mexico. The Third Season was nominated for Best International Comedy at the International Emmy Awards and won Best Comedy at the Phoenix Awards.

The show finally concluded in January 2019 with the last 3 episodes averaging a 9.5 Rating in IMDB. They sold over 100,000 pieces of Cuervos apparel with their brand partner Charly, and its official sponsor: Corona Beer, sold 10 million Club de Cuervos Beers in celebration of the team’s fake victory.

Father of the Bride

In 2019 he directed Father of the Bride for Plan B and Warner Bros.

With Andy Garcia and Gloria Estefan staring as a couple in the brink of divorce, this reimagining follows a Cuban American man in Miami who wants to preserve his traditions as his elder daughter played by Adria Arjona is about to marry a Mexican Fiancé played by Diego Boneta.

Produced by Jeremy Kleiner and Dede Gardner, this version of the title got an 80% score on Rotten Tomatoes and drew HBO Max’s Biggest Audience For A Streaming-Only Film.

Filmography

Film

Television

References

External links
 

Living people
Film directors from Mexico City
Mexican male screenwriters
USC School of Cinematic Arts alumni
Writers from Mexico City
1977 births